Yang Zhaohui  is a Chinese football midfielder who played for China in the 1984 Asian Cup. He also played for Beijing Guoan F.C.

Career statistics

International statistics

External links
Team China Stats
Player profile at Sodasoccer.com

1962 births
Living people
Chinese footballers
Footballers from Beijing
Association football midfielders
China international footballers
Beijing Guoan F.C. players